Mantidactylus melanopleura is a species of frog in the family Mantellidae. It is endemic to Madagascar. Its natural habitats are subtropical or tropical moist lowland forests and rivers. It is threatened by habitat loss.

References

melanopleura
Endemic frogs of Madagascar
Taxonomy articles created by Polbot
Amphibians described in 1901